The 2005 Taylor Woodrow Grand Prix of San Jose was the eighth round of the 2005 Bridgestone Presents the Champ Car World Series Powered by Ford season, held on July 31, 2005 on the streets of San Jose, California.  Sébastien Bourdais swept both the pole and the race win.  The race was notable for the large bump on the main straight where a light rail track crossed the course, the bump being large enough to cause the cars to catch air.

Qualifying results
Because of circuit construction issues on Friday, the Qualification 1 session was canceled.  Only times from Saturday's Qualification 2 session were used to set the grid for the race.

Race

Caution flags

Notes

 New Track Record Sébastien Bourdais 54.243 (Qualification Session)
 New Race Lap Record Sébastien Bourdais 55.083
 New Race Record Sébastien Bourdais 1:45:42.889
 Average Speed 76.431 mph

Championship standings after the race
Drivers' Championship standings

 Note: Only the top five positions are included.

References

External links
 Full Weekend Times & Results
 Qualifying Results
 Race Box Score
 Rail line jump video

Taylor Woodrow Grand Prix
San Jose
Sports in San Jose, California